AeroCopter Inc. is a new venture backed by  YAS Ventures LLC and two Entrepreneurs Siamak Yassini and George Syrovy and it is aimed at pioneering the third generation of airborne transportation.

Overview
AeroCopter is dedicated to the development of a revolutionary, best-in-class, scalable Counter-Rotating Mono-Tilt-Rotor (MTR) aircraft system with Vertical Take Off and Landing (VTOL) capabilities, with patented technology that is accessible and affordable to the Commercial Personal Air Vehicle (PAV) Sarus, Civil and Military Unmanned Aerial Vehicles (UAVs) Kestrel, and Very Light Jet (VLJ) markets.  It differs from previous tiltrotors in that instead of each rotor consisting of long blades attached to a central rotary ring, it has a single rotary ring which has a diameter equal to the entire wingspan of the aircraft, with the ring being attached to the tips of the wings. Small blades are attached to the outside of the ring. After vertical takeoff, the ring tilts from horizontal to vertical and the craft switches to flight mode with the fuselage of the aircraft being in the center of the ring.

See also
 Mono tiltrotor

References

 "Personal Planes: 2012." Popular Science, Vol. 274, no. 5, May 2009. 
 Streep, Abe. " The Personal Tilt-Rotor." Popular Science, Vol. 274, no. 5, May 2009.

External links
 Personal Air Vehicle (PAV) "Sarus" page on aerocopter.com
 "AeroCopter seeks funding for 'mono tiltrotor'", flightglobal.com
 "AeroCopter, Inc. Introduces a Mono-Tilt-Rotor (MTR) ...", Reuters
 "Personal Planes: 2012", popsci.com

Tiltrotor aircraft